Non-Fiction is Bob Bennett's third release.

Track listing
All songs written by Bob Bennett, except where noted.

"Savior Of The World" (Bob Bennett/Michael Aguilar) – 5:44
"Waking/Falling Dream" – 2:43
"Where The Shadows Fall Like Rain" – 3:43
"Numbers Game" – 4:20
"The View From Kenmar Lane" – 3:45
"Will You Hold On To Me?" – 4:46
"Laughing Like You" – 4:48
"Voices" – 4:03
"Still Rolls The Stone" – 4:50

Personnel
 Bob Bennett – acoustic guitar, vocals, composer 
 Wayne Brasel – electric guitar 
 David Mansfield – electric guitar 
 Jim Johnson – electric bass 
 John Patitucci – electric bass 
 Jim Keltner – drums 
 Alex MacDougall – percussion 
 John Schreiner – keyboards 
 Jonathan David Brown – producer, recording, mixing, background vocals
 Smitty Price – keyboards, charts, track arrangements
 Victor Feldman - percussion
 Vinnie Colaiuta - drums

Release history
Non-Fiction was released by Star Song in 1985.

References

Bob Bennett (singer-songwriter) albums
1985 albums